William Wilcox may refer to:

William Cullen Wilcox (1850–1928), American missionary to South Africa
William Wilcox (footballer) (active 1910s–1925), English footballer
William H. Wilcox, American soldier and Medal of Honor recipient
W. Bradford Wilcox (born 1970), professor of sociology at the University of Virginia

See also
William Willcox (disambiguation)
William Willcocks (1852–1932), engineer
William Wilcocks, MP for New Romney